Emmanuel Farhi (8 September 1978 – 23 July 2020) was a French economist and professor of economics at Harvard University.
His research focused on macroeconomics, taxation and finance. He was a member of the French Economic Analysis Council to the French Prime Minister from 2010 to 2012.

Education 
The son of an economist of Egyptian Jewish descent, Farhi grew up in Paris where he attended the Lycée Louis-le-Grand. At age 16 he won the Concours général in Physics and continued on to study Mathematics in preparatory class. Ranking 1st on the national entry exam to the elite engineering school École Polytechnique in 1997, he eventually chose to attend another prestigious French graduate school, École Normale Supérieure. He specialized in Mathematics obtaining 2nd place on the Agrégation de Mathematiques (French degree). He was then admitted to the Corps des Mines in 2001.

He finished his studies at the Massachusetts Institute of Technology (MIT) and was awarded a Ph.D. in 2006. That same year he began working at Harvard as assistant professor in the Faculty of Arts and Sciences. He received tenure four years later when he was named a full professor.

Career 
Farhi started his career in the Economics department of Harvard in 2006 and was tenured in 2010. One of the leading economists of his generation both in the U.S. and in France, Farhi’s research focused on macroeconomics and finance, specifically on financial stability and reforming the international monetary system. A former economic adviser to French Prime Minister François Fillon, the International Monetary Fund named Farhi one of the 25 best economists under 45 in 2014. 

Though highly quantitative, his work shed light on practical issues such as macroprudential regulation, mitigating the impacts of economic crises or understanding the implications of fiscal policies. For example, he assessed the controversial Social VAT, a measure introduced by French President Nicolas Sarkozy and repealed by his successor Francois Hollande only to reemerge under a different form: the "Competitiveness Pact". Farhi’s work cast a spotlight on a range of issues, including monetary economics, public finance, international economics, global imbalances, fiscal policy, and taxation. He also focused on issues like mitigating the impacts of economic crises and macroprudential regulation, a system used to describe the laws, rules, and conditions for banks and financial organizations that are meant to protect the whole financial system from risk.

Farhi was granted several awards for his work, including
 2009 Bernácer Prize for the best European economist under the age of 40
 2011 Malinvaud Prize
 2013 Best Young Economist prize awarded by the Cercle des économistes
 2013 Banque de France and Toulouse School of Economics (BDF-TSE) Award in Monetary Economics and Finance

In September 2014, the IMF published a list of the 25 “economists under 45 [who] will have the most influence in the coming decades on our understanding of the global economy”.
Farhi was one of the 7 French economists listed for his work on "monetary economics, international economics, finance and public finance, including research on global imbalances, monetary and fiscal policy, and taxation."

Farhi frequently co-authored academic papers with Ivan Werning, David Baqaee, Xavier Gabaix and Jean Tirole among many others.

Personal life 
Farhi died on July 23, 2020 after a suicide. He was 41.

Selected publications 
Farhi authored and published many academic articles and a book.
 Reforming the International Monetary System
 « Speculative Growth: Hints from the US Economy » (en coll.), American Economic Review, vol. 96, n° 4, September 2006.
 « Saving and Investing for Early Retirement: A Theoretical Analysis » (en coll.), Journal of Financial Economics, vol. 83, n° 1, 2007.
 « An Equilibrium Model of Global Imbalances and Low Interest Rates » (en coll.), American Economic Review, 2008.
 « A Theory of Liquidity and Regulation of Financial Intermediation » (en coll.), Review of Economic Studies, 2009.
 « Progressive Estate Taxation » (en coll.), Quarterly Journal of Economics, 2010.
 « Nonlinear Capital Taxation without Commitment » (with Christopher Sleet, Iván Werning, and Sevin Yeltekin) Review of Economic Studies, October 2012, 79, no. 4: 1469–1493.

References

External links 
 Harvard Bio page
 Harvard Crimson Tenure Article in 2010
 Farhi's comments on Social VAT posted on Greg Mankiw's blog in July 2007.
 Econ Focus interview, Federal Reserve Bank of Richmond, Second/Third Quarter 2019

1978 births
2020 deaths
French people of Egyptian-Jewish descent
Place of death missing
Fellows of the Econometric Society
21st-century  French economists
École Normale Supérieure alumni
MIT School of Humanities, Arts, and Social Sciences alumni
Harvard University faculty